Cotton–Ropkey House, also known as the Ropkey House, is a historic home located at Indianapolis, Marion County, Indiana.  It was built about 1850, and is a two-story, three bay by four bay, transitional Italianate / Greek Revival style timber frame dwelling.  It has a hipped roof and is sheathed in clapboard siding.

It was added to the National Register of Historic Places in 1984, and was delisted in 2017.

References

External links

Houses on the National Register of Historic Places in Indiana
Italianate architecture in Indiana
Greek Revival houses in Indiana
Houses completed in 1850
Houses in Indianapolis
Former National Register of Historic Places in Indiana
National Register of Historic Places in Indianapolis
1850 establishments in Indiana